"Lady" is a song written by Lionel Richie and first recorded by American country music artist Kenny Rogers. It was released in September 1980 on the album Kenny Rogers' Greatest Hits.

It is listed at #60 on Billboard's All Time Top 100.

Song history
The song was written and produced by Lionel Richie, recorded in 1980, and ranks among Kenny Rogers's biggest hits. Rogers once told an interviewer, 

The success of "Lady" also boosted Richie's career. The production work on the song was his first outside the Commodores and foreshadowed his success as a solo act during the 1980s. Rogers was also a featured vocalist on "We Are the World", co-written by Richie. Richie performed "Lady" himself on his 1998 album, Time, and he and Rogers performed the song as a duet on Richie's 2012 release Tuskegee. Lionel Richie had originally pitched this song to the Commodores and they turned it down. Then later, it was given to Kenny Rogers to record and it became the biggest selling hit single for him as a solo artist.

Charts
Since his breakup with the First Edition, Rogers had tasted considerable success as a solo act, with nine No. 1 entries on the Billboard magazine Hot Country Singles chart (prior to the release of "Lady"), plus several Top 10 hits on the Billboard Hot 100 and Adult Contemporary Singles charts.

"Lady," according to music historian Fred Bronson, would prove to be an important record for both Richie and Rogers. It became the first record of the 1980s to chart on all four of Billboard magazine's singles charts - country, Hot 100, adult contemporary and Top Soul Singles.

It reached No. 1 on three of those charts in late 1980. On the Hot 100, "Lady" reached the summit on 15 November and stayed at the top for a massive six-week stint (tying with Blondie's "Call Me" for the longest run of the year). On 27 December it would be knocked out of the top spot by "(Just Like) Starting Over" by John Lennon. On the Hot Country Singles chart, it would spend a week at the summit. "Lady" also peaked at number 42 on the Top Soul Singles chart.

As a country entry, "Lady" was Rogers' 10th chart-topping hit in a career that saw him collect 20 No. 1 songs between 1977 and 2000. On the Hot 100, it was his only solo chart-topping song, although Rogers would have a duet No. 1 three years later (1983's "Islands in the Stream" with Dolly Parton). On the Adult Contemporary Singles chart, "Lady" was Rogers' second (of eight) songs that reached the chart's summit. Billboard ranked it at the No. 3 song for 1981.

Weekly charts

Year-end charts

End-of-decade charts

All-time charts

See also
List of Billboard Hot 100 number-one singles of 1980

References

Bibliography
Bronson, Fred, "The Billboard Book of Number One Hits" 5th ed. Billboard Publications, New York, 2003. .
Whitburn, Joel, "Top Country Songs: 1944-2005," 2006.
Whitburn, Joel, "Top Pop Singles: 1955-2006," 2007.

External links
 

1980 singles
Kenny Rogers songs
Billboard Hot 100 number-one singles
Cashbox number-one singles
Songs written by Lionel Richie
Liberty Records singles
Pop ballads
1980 songs
1980s ballads